The Works is a weekly RTÉ One Arts magazine programme. It is broadcast in Ireland on Thursday nights at 10:15pm, focusing on the best of the week's arts and culture news, covering books, art, film, music and the performing arts. The show is presented by John Kelly and features reports from Sinéad Gleeson, Nadine O'Regan and Kevin Gildea.

References

2011 Irish television series debuts
RTÉ original programming